Tridrepana sigma is a moth in the family Drepanidae. It was described by Allan Watson in 1957. It is found in Indonesia (Buru and Ambon Island).

The wingspan is about 36-40.4 mm. Adults are similar to Tridrepana lunulata fasciata, but can be distinguished by the larger dark patch posterior to the posterodistal cell spot in the male forewings.

References

Moths described in 1957
Drepaninae
Moths of Indonesia